Denmark was represented by Ellen Winther, with the song '"Vuggevise", at the 1962 Eurovision Song Contest, which took place on 18 March in Luxembourg City. "Vuggevise" was chosen as the Danish entry at the Dansk Melodi Grand Prix on 11 February.

Six songs had been lined up to participate in the 1962 DMGP, but "Jeg snakker med mig selv", a swing-style song to be performed by Gitte Hænning, was disqualified before the event in an exceptionally strict interpretation of pre-performance rules, when the song's composer was heard whistling the melody in the canteen of broadcaster DR. It is widely believed in Danish Eurovision circles that "Jeg snakker med mig selv" would have won that year's DMGP, and would also have done much better at Eurovision than the song which was ultimately sent.

Before Eurovision

Dansk Melodi Grand Prix 1962
The DMGP was held at the Tivoli in Copenhagen, hosted by Svend Pedersen. Five songs remained after the disqualification, with the winner chosen a by jury. It is not known how many jury members there were, nor the means by which songs were scored. Previous Danish representatives Birthe Wilke and Dario Campeotto were among the other participants. Each song were performed twice. First with a big orchestra and then with a small orchestra. The winner was the song performed with the big orchestra.

At Eurovision
On the night of the final Winther performed 5th in the running order, following Austria and preceding Sweden. Each national jury awarded 3-2-1 to its top 3 songs and at the close of voting "Vuggevise" had received 2 points (1 each from Italy and Sweden), placing Denmark joint 10th (with Norway and Switzerland) of the 16 entries. The Danish jury awarded its 3 points to Sweden.

Voting

References 

1962
Countries in the Eurovision Song Contest 1962
Eurovision

da:Dansk Melodi Grand Prix 1962
fo:Dansk Melodi Grand Prix 1962